Acacia perryi is a shrub belonging to the genus Acacia and the subgenus Lycopodiifoliae. It is native to an area in the Northern Territory and the Kimberley region of Western Australia.

See also
List of Acacia species

References

perryi
Acacias of Western Australia
Taxa named by Leslie Pedley